Polynucleobacter cosmopolitanus is an aerobic, catalase- and oxidase-positive, chemo-organotrophic, nonmotile bacterium of the genus Polynucleobacter, isolated from freshwater habitats in Eurasia, South America, North America, Africa, Oceania, the Hawaiian Archipelago, in lakes located in Japan, and a river estuary of northern Taiwan. The type strain of the species was isolated from Lake Mondsee in Austria.

References

External links
Type strain of Polynucleobacter cosmopolitanus at BacDive -  the Bacterial Diversity Metadatabase

Burkholderiaceae
Bacteria described in 2010